Ilduara Mendes or Ilduara Menéndez (attested 10251058), was a Countess of Portugal, and regent of Portugal during the minority of her son.

Life
Daughter of Count Menendo González and his wife Tutadomna Moniz, Ilduara  had several brothers and sister, including Elvira Menéndez, wife of King Alfonso V of León.  She governed the county jointly with her husband Count Nuno Alvites, son of Alvito Nunes and Gontina. Since their son Mendo Nunes was a minor in 1028 when his father died, he governed the county under the tutelage of his mother Ilduara.

References

Bibliography

Year of birth unknown
1058 deaths
Portuguese nobility
County of Portugal
11th-century counts of Portugal (Asturias-León)
11th-century women rulers
11th-century Portuguese women